The group stage of the 2014 CAF Confederation Cup was played from 17 May to 24 August 2014. A total of eight teams competed in the group stage.

Draw
The draw for the group stage was held on 29 April 2014, 11:00 UTC+2, at the CAF Headquarters in Cairo, Egypt. The eight winners of the play-off round were drawn into two groups of four. Each group contained one team from each of the four seeding pots. The seeding of each team was determined by their ranking points calculated based on performances in continental club championships for the period 2009–2013.

The following eight teams were entered into the draw:

Format
In the group stage, each group was played on a home-and-away round-robin basis. The winners and runners-up of each group advanced to the semi-finals.

Tiebreakers
The teams are ranked according to points (3 points for a win, 1 point for a draw, 0 points for a loss). If tied on points, tiebreakers are applied in the following order:
Number of points obtained in games between the teams concerned
Goal difference in games between the teams concerned
Away goals scored in games between the teams concerned
Goal difference in all games
Goals scored in all games

Groups
The matchdays were 16–18 May, 23–25 May, 6–8 June, 25–27 July, 8–10 August, and 22–24 August 2014.

Group A

Group B

References

External links
Orange CAF Confederation Cup 2014, CAFonline.com

2